(born November 26, 1946) is a Japanese actor, voice actor and narrator. He is the son of actor Masami Shimojō and actress Yoshiko Tagami. He is also the famous Japanese dubbing voice actor of Eddie Murphy and Paul Michael Glaser.

Filmography

Film
Brother and Sister (1976) – Kobata
Mount Hakkoda (1977) – Private First-Class Hirayama
 (1977) – Officer Arai
House on Fire (1986) – Nakajima
 (2001)
 (2005) – Sadao Tokioka
Kamen Rider Hibiki & The Seven Senki (2005) – Ichirō Tachibana/Tōbei
Junpei, Think Again (2018)
Shadowfall (2019)
Made in Heaven (2021)

Television
 Tokugawa Ieyasu (1983)

Voice-over
Eddie Murphy
48 Hrs. (1985 Nippon TV Wednesday Road Show edition) (Reggie Hammond)
Trading Places (1992 Fuji TV and DVD edition) (Billy Ray Valentine)
The Golden Child (1989 Fuji TV edition) (Chandler Jarrell)
Beverly Hills Cop II (1990 Fuji TV edition) (Detective Axel Foley)
Coming to America (1991 Fuji TV edition) (Prince Akeem Joffer, Clarence, Randy Watson, Saul)
Harlem Nights (1993 Fuji TV edition) (Quick)
Another 48 Hrs. (1994 Fuji TV edition) (Reggie Hammond)
Boomerang (1996 Fuji TV edition) (Marcus Graham)
The Distinguished Gentleman (1995 Fuji TV edition) (Thomas Jefferson Johnson)
Beverly Hills Cop III (2000 Fuji TV edition) (Detective Axel Foley)
 Vampire in Brooklyn (2000 Fuji TV edition) (Maximillian, Preacher Pauly, Guido)
Dr. Dolittle 2 (2005 Fuji TV edition) (Doctor John Dolittle)
Showtime (VHS and DVD edition) (Officer Trey Sellars)
The Adventures of Pluto Nash (Pluto Nash) 
Fiddler on the Roof - Perchik
Japan Ad Council commercials – Narrator
Peanuts – Charlie Brown
Sekai Ururun Taizaiki – Narrator
Starsky and Hutch – David Starsky

Notes

External links

Tomu Project

1946 births
Japanese male film actors
Japanese male voice actors
Living people
Male voice actors from Setagaya
Male actors from Tokyo